Leadgate is the name of several places in the north of England:
Leadgate, County Durham
Leadgate, Cumbria
Leadgate, Northumberland